Perumanna  is a census town in the Kozhikode district in the state of Kerala, India.It belong to north kerala division. It is located 13 km distance from Kozhikode city.

Demographics
 India census, Perumanna had a population of 28027 with 13964 males and 14063 females.

Notable peoples
 Hareesh Kanaran Actor
 T Siddique politician

References

Villages in Kozhikode district
Kozhikode east